Radha Ramana (Devanagari: राधा रमण, IAST: rādhā ramaṇa) (or Radharaman) is a famous image of Radha Krishna worshiped in Hinduism. There is a famous temple of this deity in Vrindavana, Uttar Pradesh, India.

Name
This name of Krishna should be understood from a certain perspective, as a lover (ramana) of his Radha.

Historical references
The appearance of the Radha Ramana is described by Gopala Bhatta Goswami biographer Narahari in a mere four verses (Bhakti Ratnakara 4.315-19). Narahari Chakravarti puzzles over Krsnadasa's near-silence over Gopala Bhatta, concluding that Gopala Bhatta requested his junior, Krishnadasa Kaviraja to be omitted from the book out of humility (1.222-3). Unlike other biographies of Caitanya, Chaitanya Charitamrta describes Caitanya's south India tour, including his visit to Srirangam and residing with the temple priest Venkata Bhatta (Chaitanya Charitamrta 2.9.82- 165)

Famous Temple

The quaint historic temple of Radha Raman has recently celebrated its 500th anniversary. It
has a steady flow of local worshippers as well as pilgrims from around the world. It is notable for housing the image that is the oldest remaining in Vrindavan for the longest continuous period, as Radha Raman remained in Vrindavan during the iconoclastic raids by Mughal King of India Aurangzeb during the seventeenth century, when other images were removed to be hidden in safer places outside the city. Performances of classical Indian devotional music are offered in Radha Raman temple nightly.

History
Chaitanya Mahaprabhu came to Ranga Kshetra in 1511 and stayed at Venkata's home. Venkata Bhatta had two brothers, Tirumalla Bhatta and Prabodhananda Sarasvati. They all belonged to the Ramanuja sampradaya and Prabodhananda Sarasvati was a tridandi sannyasi of that order. Vyenkata Bhatta had a son named Gopal, who was then just a child.

Gopala Bhatta was a son of a priest of Srirangam. Venkata and his two brothers, Gopala's uncles Trimalla and Prabodhananda Sarasvati "were converted from their Sri Vaishnava faith in Lakshmi-Narayana as supreme to one in Radha Krishna" as Svayam bhagavan. The dialog of this conversion is recorded in 16 c. Chaitanya Charitamrita biography by Krishnadasa Kaviraja.

In the second volume of the Chaitanya charitamrita a presentation is given,  with a reference to the particular verse of the tenth canto of Bhagavata Purana as to the reason why Lakshmi also known as Sri (thus the name of Sri Sampradaya) is burning with desire and still not capable of entering to the realm of Vrindavana.

Prabodhananda Sarasvati, previously a Sri Sampradaya sannyasi, was converted to supreme position of Radha-Krishna being Svayam bhagavan instead of Lakshmi-Narayana. He as well apparently came to appreciate the supremacy of Radha worship from Chaitanya.

Being pleased with Gopala Bhatta Goswami's sincere service and devotion, Chaitanya Mahaprabhu initiated him, and ordered him to move to Vrindavana after the death of his parents and perform bhajan and write. He instructed him to serve his mother and father and always engage in chanting Krishna's glories.

At the age of thirty Gopala Bhatta Gosvami came to Vrindavana.

After Chaitanya Mahaprabhu's disappearance Gopala Bhatta Gosvami felt intense separation from the Lord. To relieve his devotee, the Lord instructed Gopala Bhatta in a dream: "If you want my darshan (visit) then make a trip to Nepal".

In Nepal, Gopala Bhatta bathed in the famous Kali-Gandaki River. Upon dipping his waterpot in the river, he was surprised to see several Shaligrama Silas enter his pot. He dropped the silas back into the river, but the silas re-entered his pot when he refilled it.

Gopala Bhatta Gosvami found twelve Shaligrama shilas. It is believed once a wealthy man came to Vrindavana and offered Gopala Bhatta a variety of clothing and ornaments for his Shaligrams in charity. However, Gopala Bhatta couldn't use these for his round-shaped Shaligrams, so he advised the donor to give the Deity decorations to someone else. It's believed that donor refused to take them back and Gopala Bhatta kept the cloths and ornaments with his Shaligramas.

On the Purnima (full moon) day of in the evening after offering  to his Shalagram shilas, Gopala Bhatta put them to rest, covering them with a wicker basket. Late in the night, Gopala Bhatta took a little rest and then, in the early morning went to take bath in the Yamuna river. Returning from his bath, he uncovered the Shaligramas in order to render the puja for them, and saw amongst them a Deity of Krishna playing a flute. There were now eleven Shaligramas and this Deity. The "Damodara shila" had manifested as the beautiful three-fold bending form of tri-bhangananda-krishna. In this way Radha Raman emerged in a perfectly shaped deity form from a sacred fossilized shaligrama stone. Devotees consider this image to be alive and that he grants a chosen family the privilege of assisting him in his daily schedule. In this way "the Lord has granted his wish and the stone was turned into a deity murti of Sri Krishna". As a narrative account of actualized Krishna-bhakti, Radharamana's appearance story highlights the divine-human relationship of love as the ontologically central category of ultimate reality.

Decorations of the Deity
The deity is typically wearing the following: feather, crown, yellow dress, and shining vaijayanti-mala (garland) on his chest. Shark shaped ornaments in his ears and a beautiful shining tilaka on his forehead.

References and notes

See also
Vrindavana
ISKCON
Svayam bhagavan
Shri Swaminarayan Mandir, Junagadh - Another temple with images of Radha Ramana

External links

Forms of Krishna
Swaminarayan Sampradaya
Mathura district